Genevieve Morris (born 1967) is an Australian comedian and actress, best known for being among the regular cast on the popular comedy series Comedy Inc and appearing in a popular advertising campaign for ANZ.

She has also had recurring roles in Seven Network police dramas Blue Heelers and City Homicide. She has performed in various stage productions since the early 1990s including the 2009 comedy show Spontaneous Broadway as Dame Helen Highwater, alongside Ross Daniels, Julia Zemiro and Geoff Paine.

In 2010, she appeared in multiple television commercials for ANZ bank portraying "Barbara the bank manager".
In 2011, Morris was part of the ensemble cast of the short-lived television series Ben Elton Live From Planet Earth where she was considered by some to be the program's breakout star. In 2013, she was a cast member of Wednesday Night Fever

More recently, she has starred in the crime comedy series No Activity as dispatch officer Carol. She also starred as a sonographer in a Doritos television commercial which was the runner-up in the 2016 Crash the Super Bowl competition.

In 2017, Morris was diagnosed with non-Hodgkin’s lymphoma, forcing her to pull out of a starring role in comedy series Sando with her role re-cast while she sought treatment. Morris is in remission after chemotherapy, and continued guest roles in The Family Law and True Story with Hamish & Andy as well as stage work.

In 2019, Morris joined the second season of comedy Squinters.

Filmography

Films

Television

References

Australian television actresses
Living people
1967 births